Bærum Kajakklubb is a sports club from Bærum, Norway.

Established in 1935, its only sport is canoe racing. It is based at Kalvøya outside of Sandvika, and has shared the locality with the rowing club Bærum RK since 1972.

Well-known members include Ivar Mathisen, Knut Østby, Harald Eriksen, Andreas Orheim, Geir Kvillum, Steinar Amundsen, Øyvind Amundsen, Harald Amundsen and Hege Brannsten.

References

Sports teams in Norway
Sports clubs established in 1935
Sport in Bærum
1935 establishments in Norway